Crocus ligusticus is a herbaceous perennial plant belonging to the genus Crocus of the family Iridaceae. The genus nane Crocus is a Chaldean name meaning "saffron", while the specific Latin name ligusticus, meaning ligurian, refers to the distribution area of this species.

Description
The grass-like ensiform leaves are fully grown in May. The solitary pale purple flowers bear three anthers with yellow-orange pollen and bright red and very fringed stigmas protruding from the large perigonium, making it very characteristic. Crocus ligusticus is an autumn-flowering plant. The flowering period extends from September through October. Like other species of the genus Crocus,  it is slightly toxic, due to the alkaloid content.

Distribution and habitat
Crocus ligusticus is a native species of Liguria and the southern Maritime Alps in France and Italy.

Cultivation
It has gained the Royal Horticultural Society's Award of Garden Merit.

References

 Pignatti S. - Flora d'Italia - Edagricole – 1982
 Mariotti, M.G. - Crocus ligusticus n.sp., a well known species. Candollea 43: 67-680, Ginevra, 1988

External links

 Biolib
 Acta plantarum

ligusticus
Flora of Italy
Flora of France
Plants described in 1988